Francisca Aguirre Benito (27 October 1930 – 13 April 2019) was a Spanish poet and author. Her first poetry collection, Ithaca, published in 1972, won her the Leopoldo Panero Poetry Award. In 2011, she won the National Poetry Award for her poetry piece Historia de una anatomía. Aguirre also won the National Prize for Spanish Literature in November 2018.

Biography 
Aguirre was born in Alicante, the daughter of noted painter Lorenzo Aguirre. She was married to fellow poet Félix Grande from 1963 until his death in 2014. Aguirre and Grande had a daughter, poet and essayist Guadalupe Grande (born 1965). She was an aunt of poet Carlos Martínez Aguirre.

Aguirre died in Madrid on 13 April 2019, at the age of 88.

Awards 
 Leopoldo Panero Award, 1971
 City of Irún Award, 1976
 Galiana Award, 1994
 Esquío Award, 1995
 Prize Maria Isabel Fernandez Simal, 1998
 Valencian Critic Award for his entire work, 2001
 Alfons el Magnànim Award, 2007
 Poetry Prize "Real Sitio and Villa de Aranjuez", 2009 
 Miguel Hernández International Award, 2010
 National Poetry Award, 2011. 
 Favorite Daughter of Alicante in 2012. 
 National Prize for Spanish Letters , 2018.

References

1930 births
2019 deaths
20th-century Spanish poets
21st-century Spanish poets
20th-century Spanish women writers
21st-century Spanish women writers
People from Alicante
Spanish women poets
Writers from the Valencian Community